Michelle Marianne Tokarczyk (born 1953) is an American author, poet, and literary critic. She is a long-time professor of English and former co-director of the Writing Program at Goucher College. Her works focus on people living in urban environments, literary history, and women's studies and issues.

Early life and education 
Michelle Marianne Tokarczyk was born in 1953 in the Bronx to a working-class Ukrainian American family. At the age of nine, she moved to a suburban area of Queens. She earned her bachelor's degree at Lehman College. Tokarczyk completed her doctorate in English from Stony Brook University in 1986. Her dissertation was entitled The Rosenberg Case and E. L. Doctorow's The Book of Daniel: A Study of the Use of History in Fiction.

Career 
Tokarczyk began working as professor of English at Goucher College in 1989. In 2003, she was a co-director of the Goucher Writing Program. Her poetry focuses on urban people, especially women. She also researches literary criticism, history, and women's studies and issues. Tokarczyk is the author of several books.

In 2010, Tokarczyk was the Goucher chapter president of the American Association of University Professors. She was the vice president of the Maryland Conference of the American Association of University Professors in 2014. As of April 2018, Tokarczyk is the president of the Maryland Conference.

Personal life 
Tokarczyk lives in Baltimore and New York City. She is married to economist Paul Groncki.

Selected works

Books

References 

Living people
Goucher College faculty and staff
Lehman College alumni
Writers from Baltimore
Stony Brook University alumni
Writers from the Bronx
People from Queens, New York
Poets from New York (state)
Poets from Maryland
American people of Ukrainian descent
1953 births